Summer Catch is a 2001 American romantic comedy film directed by Michael Tollin and starring Freddie Prinze Jr., Jessica Biel and Matthew Lillard. The film marked Tollin's feature film directorial debut. The setting is the Cape Cod Baseball League, but the majority of the film was shot in Southport, North Carolina.

Plot
Ryan Dunne is a local baseball player who dreams of playing in the Major Leagues. He helps his dad with his landscaping business and takes care of Veteran's Field, where his team, the Chatham A's play.

Ryan, in his dedication to making the pros, has sworn off girls and drinking to avoid distractions. This changes when he sees Tenley Parrish, as he and his father are mowing the Parrish family's lawn.

The next day, the A's have their first game of the season where rival Van Leemer shines pitching a shut-out, while Ryan is told to walk the stands for donations. That evening Ryan and Tenley have their first kiss.

The next night Ryan is pitching in his first game of the season. The game goes well for the A's until the last inning when he gives up a grand slam, allowing the other team to win the game. He returns home to find his dad drunk and upset about the loss.

Later, Ryan visits Tenley, where he confides about his rocky relationship with his father and concerns about failing as a baseball player. The next night, they take an evening swim in her pool in the rain, falling in love, before being chased off by her dad.

Ryan is distracted by Tenley and feels a lot of pressure from scouts, family, the Parrish family, and friends. He is told that he's starting for an upcoming big game, where Ryan starts well, but comes apart later on. The loss causes him to be demoted to the bullpen in a relief position. Despite the bad outing, Hugh Alexander, a scout for the Philadelphia Phillies in attendance, shows interest in Ryan.

Eric Van Leemer and Dale Robin are kicked off the team not only for their bad behavior, but also for accidentally burning down a press box, so Ryan is designated to start the final game, as he has the freshest arm and the most rest.

Tenley tells Ryan that she's leaving for San Francisco for a job the following night, also the night of the final game. She tells him to let himself be great, before tearfully hugging him goodbye.

Inspired by Tenley's words of encouragement, Ryan pitches one of the best performances ever seen in the Cape League, dominating the game with a no-hitter. His friends, dad and brother, and several major league scouts, including Alexander, are in attendance. Late in the game, he notices that Tenley has stopped by on her way to the airport to watch him. He proceeds to strike out the current batter, marking his eleventh strike-out of the game, and looks back to see that Tenley has gone.

Ryan rushes to the airport where he catches Tenley before she boards her plane. They both profess their love for each other and she agrees to forgo her job in San Francisco and stay. Ryan's dad and brother soon arrive with the scout Alexander, to tell him that his team won the game with a combined no-hitter. Alexander offers Ryan a contract with the Phillies that will start him out at their minor league affiliate, which he happily accepts.

Later, everyone is gathered to watch Ryan in his Major League debut as a relief pitcher for the Phillies. He delivers his first pitch to Ken Griffey Jr., who launches it into the stands for a home run.

Cast
 Freddie Prinze Jr. as Ryan Dunne
 Jessica Biel as Tenley Parrish
 Fred Ward as Sean Dunne
 Matthew Lillard as Billy Brubaker
 Jason Gedrick as Mike Dunne
 Brittany Murphy as Dede Mulligan
 Brian Dennehy as Coach John Schiffner
 Gabriel Mann as Auggie Mulligan
 Bruce Davison as Rand Parrish
 John C. McGinley as Hugh Alexander (uncredited)
 Marc Blucas as Miles Dalrymple
 Wilmer Valderrama as Mickey Dominguez
 Corey Pearson as Eric Van Leemer
 Christian Kane as Dale Robin
 Zena Grey as Katie Parrish
 Traci Dinwiddie as Lauren
 Susan Gardner as Marjorie
 Beverly D'Angelo as Lusty House Mother (uncredited)
Phillies players Mike Lieberthal, Doug Glanville, and Pat Burrell, along with outfielder Ken Griffey, Jr., make appearances at the end of the film. Other notable cameos in the movie include Kevin Youkilis, Curt Gowdy, Hank Aaron and Carlton Fisk.

Production

The film was not filmed in New England because the spring season was too cold so the actual production site was in Southport, North Carolina. The Chatham A's baseball field that was used in the film was actually built from a field that had been abandoned for about 20 years. Within about eight weeks the field was complete with batting cages and a press box ready to film. Since the filming of the movie, the field has once again been abandoned and is simply an overgrown field.  The majority of the people cast for the roles of the teammates were actual minor-league baseball players. Only seven of the 35 people cast for the roles of the teammates were actors. The baseball players had to attend a four-week training camp during which they learned how to ignore the cameras on the field and to feel and act more as a team. All of the actors had to practice every day.

Prinze was reportedly paid $2 million for his performance.

Reception

Critical response 
On Rotten Tomatoes the film holds an approval rating of 8% based on 91 reviews, with an average rating of 3.4/10. The website's critics consensus reads: "A clichéd and predictable sports comedy that's mostly devoid of excitement or laughs, Summer Catch is strictly bush-league." On Metacritic, the film has a weighted average score of 21 out of 100 based on reviews from 25 critics, indicating "generally unfavorable reviews". Audiences polled by CinemaScore gave the film an average grade of "B+" on an A+ to F scale.

Lawrence Van Gelder of The New York Times wrote that it was "figuratively and literally a minor league movie." He opened his critique by stating, "Take the romantic impulse behind F. Scott Fitzgerald's story Winter Dreams. Add some New England small-town social stratification from John P. Marquand's novel Point of No Return. Add a pinch of lusty Apple Annies from Bull Durham and some townie-preppy animosity from Good Will Hunting. Then bury the whole thing under a mound of standard-issue parent-child conflicts and enough self-help clichés to drive Polonius to the aquavit barrel at Elsinore. Sprinkle with half-baked characters and a predictably odds-defying outcome, and the result is Summer Catch."

Joe Leydon of Variety was more forgiving with his analysis, but explained, "With its haphazard mix of boisterously crude comedy, romantic entanglements, class-conscious clashes and intensely competitive hardball, pic plays like it was inspired by a late-night channel surf through Major League, Bull Durham, One Crazy Summer and some late-’50s wrong-side-of-the-tracks meller." He praised George Fenton’s score and the film's humor, singling out Matthew Lillard, Brittany Murphy and Beverly D'Angelo.

Marc Savlov of The Austin Chronicle gave the movie 1 1/2 stars out of 5, adding, "Baseball, summer, apple pie, and Freddie Prinze Jr.'s bare butt – what could be more American? Toss in a brief glance at Matthew Lillard's equally nekkid behind and you've got a better-late-than-never entry in the clichéd teen love-story genre that, while generally inoffensive, is nonetheless so cloyingly heartfelt that it's all you can do not to giggle every time someone makes a prophetic, lovestruck proclamation (of which there are many)."

Box office
The film opened at #6 at the U.S. box office raking in $7 million in its opening weekend. Summer Catch went on to gross $19 million worldwide, failing to bring back its $34 million budget.

Home media
Summer Catch was released on VHS and DVD on December 4, 2001.

Soundtrack
 Sweet Summer - Radford
 Jump (The Velvet Rope) - Clara Star a.k.a. Seven and the Sun
 Would You...? - Touch and Go
 Straight To... Number One - Touch and Go
 Bohemian Like You - The Dandy Warhols
 Soul Sound - Sugababes
 Let It Go - The Clarks
 Mr. Hawkins - Uncle Kracker
 Another Day - Nine Days
 Anything and Everything - Youngstown
 Everytime She Walks - Fastball
 I Like It - The Miami Allstars
 Going Back to Cali - Rick Rubin and LL Cool J
 Over My Head - Semisonic
 Makes No Difference - Sum 41
 The Whole Enchilada - Brett Laurence
 Wild Blue Night - Frina Harmon, Dillon O'Brian, and Matthew Gerrard
 Skin - Collective Soul
 Tell Her This - Diffuser
 What It Beez Like - Tarsha Vega
 Sometimes - Michael Franti and Spearhead
 Lovin' Each Day - Ronan Keating

References

External links

 
 
 
 
 

2001 films
2001 directorial debut films
2001 romantic comedy films
2000s sports comedy films
American baseball films
American romantic comedy films
American sports comedy films
Films directed by Michael Tollin
Films scored by George Fenton
Films set in Massachusetts
Films shot in Massachusetts
Films shot in North Carolina
Films shot in Ohio
Films with screenplays by John Gatins
Philadelphia Phillies
2000s English-language films
2000s American films